Hua Yuan Science and Technology Association 华源 (HYSTA) is a 501(c)(6) nonprofit organization aimed at business leaders, professionals, entrepreneurs and students who wish to promote business, cultural exchange, and to foster U.S. - China business relationships, and to facilitate networking and exchange of business ideas among Chinese entrepreneurs and executives in Silicon Valley and mainland China.

HYSTA has been described as linked to the Chinese government's systems of technology transfer. HYSTA is partnered with the Shanghai Association for the International Exchange of Personnel, an organization that is part of the China Association for the International Exchange of Personnel, which is under the auspices of the State Administration of Foreign Experts Affairs (now the Ministry of Science and Technology).

History 

HYSTA was established in 1999 by a group of Chinese entrepreneurs in Silicon Valley. They created HYSTA with the hope to share their experiences and knowledge with young Chinese professionals entering the business world. HYSTA (华源), in Chinese, means both Chinese origin and resources for the Chinese.

Organization 

Leadership in HYSTA华源 from 2009 to 2010:

 HP Jin - President of HYSTA, co-founder, President and CEO, TeleNav
 Shoucheng Zhang - Vice President of HYSTA, Professor of Physics, Applied Physics and Electrical Engineering at Stanford University; Sr. adviser, Legend Holding
 Lili Zheng - CFO of HYSTA, Partner, Deloitte
 Jay Chen - Executive Director of HYSTA 2010
 Leslie Yuen - Executive Director of HYSTA 2012

References

External links 

 

China–United States relations
Non-profit organizations based in California
Technology transfer